Lourens Jacobus Erasmus (born 14 June 1993) is a South African professional rugby union player for the in Super Rugby and NTT DoCoMo Red Hurricanes in the Japanese Top League. His regular position is lock.

Career

After matriculating in 2011, he made the move to Johannesburg to join the  academy prior to the 2012 season. One of his starts came in the semi-final against , but he could not prevent the side from Cape Town winning the match 24–14.

He once again finished the regular season by scoring two tries in a match, this time in a 76–7 victory over the s, and once again suffered a semi-final defeat at the hands of Western Province, who beat the Golden Lions U21s 44–41 after extra time.

In 2014, Erasmus was included in the  squad for the 2014 Vodacom Cup competition. The Golden Lions finished in fourth spot on the Northern Section log to secure a place in the quarter finals, where they met a  that topped the Southern Section. He was named in the  squad for the 2014 Under-21 Provincial Championship, but failed to make any appearances in the competition.

He returned to action for the Golden Lions in the 2015 Vodacom Cup. He didn't feature in the semi-final, which saw eventual champions the  win the match 43–20.

Statistics

References

1993 births
Living people
Golden Lions players
Lions (United Rugby Championship) players
NTT DoCoMo Red Hurricanes Osaka players
Rugby union locks
Rugby union number eights
Rugby union players from Pretoria
South African rugby union players
Urayasu D-Rocks players